Coptops robustipes is a species of beetle in the family Cerambycidae. It was described by Maurice Pic in 1925, originally under the genus Mutatocoptops.

References

robustipes
Beetles described in 1925